This is a list of video games developed, published, or licensed by Lucasfilm Games.

C.  A compilation of previously released titles

LucasArts
LucasArts games